Edna Mary Therese Maskell  (13 April 1928 – 23 June 2018) was a hurdler who won the gold medal in the 80 metres hurdles as a competitor for Northern Rhodesia at the 1954 British Empire and Commonwealth Games in Vancouver. Her personal best time was 11.2 seconds. She also won the bronze medal in the 100 yards sprint at 1954 British Empire and Commonwealth Games and finished 10th in the long jump. Previously, she competed at the 1952 Summer Olympics in Helsinki for South Africa, finishing 5th in her heat of the 80 metres hurdles.

References

External links
 

1928 births
2018 deaths
South African female hurdlers
Zambian female hurdlers
Zambian female sprinters
Olympic athletes of South Africa
Athletes (track and field) at the 1952 Summer Olympics
Commonwealth Games gold medallists for Northern Rhodesia
Commonwealth Games bronze medallists for Northern Rhodesia
Athletes (track and field) at the 1954 British Empire and Commonwealth Games
Commonwealth Games medallists in athletics
Zambian people of British descent
White Zambian people
South African people of British descent
White South African people
Medallists at the 1954 British Empire and Commonwealth Games